Moorsbus is a network of bus services operating to and around the North York Moors National Park and surrounding areas. It was operated from the 1980s by the North York Moors National Park Authority, and linked places such as Malton, Teesside, Thirsk, York and Hull to the National Park.

The Moorsbus connected those in major towns and cities in the region with the picturesque villages and attractions of the National Park on Sundays and Bank Holidays when there were no other public transport services. The network ceased operation at the end of October 2013 following severe budgetary constraints for the North York Moors National Park Authority, its sponsor.

A new but much reduced service ran on summer Sundays and Bank Holidays in 2014 after a campaign by Friends of Moorsbus. East Yorkshire Motor Services ran a service from Hull to Danby via Beverley and Pickering, and the Dales and Bowland Community Interest Company, on behalf of the Moorsbus Community Interest Company, ran the Moors Rambler from Darlington to Pickering via Middlesbrough and Guisborough.

In 2015, East Yorkshire Motor Services started its Sunday/Bank holiday service on 3 April, whilst Moorsbus Community Interest Company ran two buses, covering Darlington, Teesside, Saltburn, Redcar, Guisborough, Northallerton, Thirsk, Kirkbymoorside, Helmsley and Pickering, from 5 July.
In 2016 Moorsbus Community Interest Company is operating three buses. One route runs from Darlington via Stockton, Middlesbrough, Guisborough and Danby to Pickering (as in previous years). The service from Saltburn and Redcar operates via Guisborough, Stokesley, Northallerton and Thirsk with a new route via Coxwold, Byland Abbey and Ampleforth to Helmsley. An additional bus (provided by Ryedale Community Transport) runs from Malton, Pickering and Kirkbymoorside to provide a shuttle between Helmsley and Rievaulx Abbey, with 3 return trips from Helmsley to Sutton Bank Visitor Centre.
Funding for the services comes from fares, but with a substantial contribution from parish and town councils, individual passengers, Ryedale District Council, the North York Moors National Park Authority and the North Yorkshire Moors Association.

Operators that currently hold Moorbus contracts are: Arriva, First York, Relliance and York Pullman.

Gallery

References

External links
www.moorsbus.org Company website
Previous Moorsbus information - Web archive

Bus operators in North Yorkshire
Bus routes in England
North York Moors
Transport in North Yorkshire